Ganitumab is a human monoclonal antibody against type 1 insulin-like growth factor receptor (IGF1R), designed for the treatment of cancers.

Ganitumab was developed by Amgen. A phase III clinical trial (for metastatic pancreatic cancer) was abandoned in August 2012.

References 

Amgen
Abandoned drugs